Ukleja is a river of Poland. It is a tributary of Rega river south of Płoty.

See also
Sąpólna

References

Rivers of Poland
Rivers of West Pomeranian Voivodeship